Lyle Eidsness (born June 14, 1941) is a former American football coach.  He served as the head football coach at the University of Wisconsin–Stout, Morningside College, and Augustana College in Sioux Falls, South Dakota, compiling a career college football coaching record of 31–53.

Coaching career
Eidsness was the head football coach at Morningside College in Sioux City, Iowa.  He held that position for the 1980 season.  His coaching record at Morningside was 3–8.

Head coaching record

College

References

1941 births
Living people
Augustana (South Dakota) Vikings football coaches
Ferris State Bulldogs football coaches
Morningside Mustangs football coaches
Sioux Falls Cougars football coaches
Southwest Minnesota State Mustangs football coaches
Wisconsin–Stout Blue Devils football coaches
High school basketball coaches in the United States
High school football coaches in Iowa
High school football coaches in Minnesota
Augustana University alumni
South Dakota State University alumni